The 2019 Atlantic Hockey Tournament is the 15th Atlantic Hockey Tournament. It was played between March 8 and March 23, 2019 at home campus locations and at the HarborCenter in Buffalo, New York. By winning the tournament, American International earned Atlantic Hockey's automatic bid to the 2019 NCAA Division I Men's Ice Hockey Tournament.

Format
The tournament features four rounds of play. In the first round the sixth and eleventh, seventh and tenth, and eighth and ninth seeds, as determined by the conference regular season standings, will play a best-of-three series with the winners advancing to the quarterfinals. The top five teams from the conference regular season standings receive a bye to the quarterfinals. There, the first seed and lowest-ranked first-round winner, the second seed and second-highest-ranked first-round winner, the third seed and highest-ranked first-round winner, and the fourth seed and the fifth seed will play a best-of-three series, with the winners advancing to the semifinals. In the semifinals, the highest and lowest seeds and second-highest and second-lowest remaining seeds will play a single game each, with the winners advancing to the championship game. The tournament champion will receive an automatic bid to the 2019 NCAA Division I Men's Ice Hockey Tournament.

Standings

Bracket
Teams are reseeded for the quarterfinals and semifinals

Note: * denotes overtime period(s)

Results

First round

(6) Niagara vs. (11) Canisius

(7) Mercyhurst vs. (10) Army

(8) Robert Morris vs. (9) Holy Cross

Quarterfinals

(1) American International vs. (10) Army

(2) Bentley vs. (8) Robert Morris

(3) Air Force vs. (6) Niagara

(4) Sacred Heart vs. (5) RIT

Semifinals

(1) American International vs. (8) Robert Morris

(5) RIT vs. (6) Niagara

Championship

(1) American International vs. (6) Niagara

Tournament awards

All-Tournament Team
G Zackarias Skog* (American International)
D Jānis Jaks (American International)
D Ryan Polin (American International)
F Hugo Reinhardt (American International)
F Blake Christensen (American International)
F Ludwig Stenlund (Niagara)
* Most Valuable Player(s)

References

Atlantic Hockey Tournament
Atlantic Hockey Tournament